Tominotus is a genus of burrowing bugs in the family Cydnidae. There are about 11 described species in Tominotus.

Species
These 11 species belong to the genus Tominotus:
 Tominotus brevirostris Froeschner
 Tominotus brevis (Signoret, 1881)
 Tominotus caecus (Van Duzee, 1922)
 Tominotus communis (Uhler, 1877)
 Tominotus conformis (Uhler, 1876)
 Tominotus hogenhoferi Signoret
 Tominotus inconspicuus
 Tominotus laeviculus
 Tominotus ondulatus Schwertner, 2017
 Tominotus signoreti (Mulsant & Rey, 1866)
 Tominotus unisetosus Froeschner, 1960

References

Further reading

 
 

Cydnidae
Articles created by Qbugbot
Pentatomomorpha genera